Javier Ruiz may refer to:

 Javier Ruiz Pérez, Spanish business journalist
 Javier Ruiz (sailor), Mexican sailor
 Javier Ruiz Rueda, Mexican composer and writer
 Javier Ruiz de Larrinaga, Spanish racing cyclist